Malin Linda Maria Nilsson (born 20 October 1973 in Malmö, Skåne) is a former freestyle swimmer from Sweden, who competed for her native country at two consequentive Summer Olympics, starting in 1992. She won a total number of three silver medals at the European Swimming Championships in the 1990s.

Clubs
Malmö Kappsimningsklubb

References

1976 births
Living people
Swimmers at the 1992 Summer Olympics
Swimmers at the 1996 Summer Olympics
Olympic swimmers of Sweden
Sportspeople from Malmö
Swedish female freestyle swimmers
Medalists at the FINA World Swimming Championships (25 m)
European Aquatics Championships medalists in swimming
20th-century Swedish women